Brian Edward Fitzpatrick (born November 6, 1989) is an Irish-American professional basketball player who plays the power forward position for KR of the Icelandic first division. He has represented the Irish National Team and played college basketball at Bucknell University.

High school career
Fitzpatrick played at Xavier High School before doing a post-graduate year at Northfield Mount Hermon.

College career
In October 2008, he committed to the University of Pennsylvania.  During his freshman season, head coach Glen Miller was fired and he transferred to Bucknell University.  He redshirted for one season and played three more years for the Bison. In 2014, he was named to the academic All-Patriot League team.

Professional career
In August 2014, Fitzpatrick signed a two-year deal with Rethymno Aegean B.C. However, he was released in October and transferred to Panionios also of the Greek Basket League. In January 2015, he signed for the rest of the season with Horsens IC. He helped them win the double and was named Finals MVP. In September 2015, he resigned with Horsens IC for another season and helped them repeat as champions of the Danish League. 
In August 2016, Fitzpatrick signed with Levanga Hokkaido in the first division of the Japanese B.League.  Following an injury, he was released from his contract in early November.  On December 26, he signed with BK Prostějov of the NBL for the rest of the season. After missing the next season with an ACL tear, he signed with Borås Basket for the 2018–2019 season. After helping Borås Basket to the SBL finals, he signed with San Martin Corrientes of the LNB in July 2019 for the 2019–2020 season.

In January 2021, Fitzpatrick signed with Úrvalsdeild karla club Haukar. In 21 games, he averaged 14.1 points and 10.0 rebounds per game.
In August 2021, Fitzpatrick signed with BC Odessa of the Ukrainian Basketball SuperLeague for the 2021–2022 season. He finished the season with Olimpia of the LUB following the 2022 Russian invasion of Ukraine. 

In August 2022, Fitzpatrick was announced as a new player for Bashkimi of the Superliga and Balkan League for the 2022-2023 season. 

In December 2022, Fitzpatrick signed with Úrvalsdeild karla club KR.

International career
In 2016, Fitzpatrick played on Ireland's national team and their national 3x3 team.  He participated in the 2016 FIBA Europe 3x3 Championships qualifier in Escaldes-Engordany, Andorra. He also represented Ireland at the 2016 FIBA European Championship for Small Countries in Ciorescu, Moldova, where he was his team's top scorer and the third-best scorer of the tournament.

References

External links
 Eurobasket.com Profile
 Finals MVP on YouTube
 Úrvalsdeild statistics at Icelandic Basketball Association

1989 births
Living people
American expatriate basketball people in the Czech Republic
American expatriate basketball people in Denmark
American expatriate basketball people in Japan
American expatriate basketball people in Sweden
American men's basketball players
American people of Irish descent
Basketball players from Connecticut
Borås Basket players
Bucknell Bison men's basketball players
Centers (basketball)
Haukar men's basketball players
Horsens IC players
Ireland men's national basketball team players
Irish men's basketball players
KR men's basketball players
Levanga Hokkaido players
Northfield Mount Hermon School alumni
Panionios B.C. players
People from Cheshire, Connecticut
Penn Quakers men's basketball players
Power forwards (basketball)
Rethymno B.C. players
Sportspeople from New Haven County, Connecticut
Úrvalsdeild karla (basketball) players